Clifford may refer to:

People
Clifford (name), an English given name and surname, includes a list of people with that name
William Kingdon Clifford
Baron Clifford
Baron Clifford of Chudleigh
Baron de Clifford
Clifford baronets
Clifford family (bankers)
Jaryd Clifford
Justice Clifford (disambiguation)
Lord Clifford (disambiguation)

Arts, entertainment, and media
Clifford the Big Red Dog, a series of children's books
Clifford (character), the central character of Clifford the Big Red Dog
Clifford the Big Red Dog (2000 TV series), 2000 animated TV series
Clifford's Puppy Days, 2003 animated TV series
Clifford's Really Big Movie, 2004 animated movie
Clifford the Big Red Dog (2019 TV series), 2019 animated TV series
Clifford the Big Red Dog (film), 2021 live-action movie
Clifford (film), a 1994 film directed by Paul Flaherty
Clifford (Muppet)

Mathematics
Clifford algebra, a type of associative algebra, named after William Kingdon Clifford
Clifford analysis, a mathematical study of Dirac operators
Clifford module, a mathematical representation
Clifford theory, dealing with representations, named after Alfred H. Clifford
Clifford torus, a figure in geometric topology
Clifford's theorem, any of several mathematical derivations

Places

Australia 

 Clifford, Queensland, a locality in the Western Downs Region

Canada 

Clifford, Ontario

England 

Clifford, Devon, a location
Clifford, Herefordshire
Clifford (ward), Greater Manchester
Clifford, West Yorkshire
Clifford Chambers, Warwickshire

United States
Clifford, Indiana
Clifford, Michigan
Clifford, Missouri
Clifford, North Dakota
Clifford, Pennsylvania
Clifford, Virginia, a community in Amherst County
Clifford, Wisconsin
Clifford Township, Butler County, Kansas

Structures
Clifford Castle, a castle in the village of Clifford, England
Clifford House (Eustis, Florida), a historic house in the US state of Florida
Clifford International School, an international school in Guangzhou, People's Republic of China
Clifford Pier, a pier in Singapore
Clifford's Inn, a London (England) Inn of Chancery
Clifford's Tower, the previously-used name of York Castle in England
Clifford-Warren House, a historic house in the US state of Massachusetts

Other uses
Clifford, a New Zealand Company chartered sailing ship
Clifford Chance, an international attorney firm headquartered in London, England
Clifford (horse), a world champion racehorse in the late 19th century